Johannes Jisse (Hans) Duistermaat (The Hague, December 20, 1942 – Utrecht, March 19, 2010) was a Dutch mathematician.

Biography 
Duistermaat attended primary school in Jakarta, at the time capital of the Dutch East Indies, where his family moved after the end of World War II. In 1957, a few years after the Indonesian independence, they came back to the Netherlands and Duistermaat completed his high school studies in Vlaardingen.

From 1959 to 1965 he studied studied mathematics at Utrecht University, and he obtained his PhD degree at the same institution in 1968, with a thesis on the mathematical structures of thermodynamics entitled "Energy and Entropy as Real Morphisms for Addition and Order". His original supervisor was the applied mathematician Günther K. Braun, who passed away one year before the thesis defense, so the official supervision was taken over by geometer Hans Freudenthal.

After a postdoctoral stay in Lund (1969–70), Duistermaat returned to the Netherlands in 1971 and became in 1972 full professor in Nijmegen. In 1974 he returned to Utrecht, where he was offered the chair of Freudenthal.

In 2004 he was awarded a special academy professorship by the KNAW, allowing him to focus exclusively on research, even after his official retirement in 2007. He died in March 2010, due to non-Hodgkin lymphoma and pneumonia.

He was elected a member of the Royal Netherlands Academy of Arts and Sciences in 1982, and of Academia Europaea in 1993. In 2007 he became a Knight of the Order of the Netherlands Lion.

Apart from being an eminent mathematician, Duistermaat was also a good chess player. In a simultaneous match of 10 against Anatoly Karpov in 1977, Duistermaat was the only one who did not lose.

Research 
Duistermaat defined himself a geometric analyst, but his research covered many different areas in analysis, geometry and mathematical physics, including classical mechanics, symplectic geometry, Fourier integral operators, partial differential equations, algebraic geometry, harmonic analysis, and dynamical systems.

Duistermaat dropped thermodynamics after his PhD, due to dissents between mathematicians and physicists in Utrecht. Nevertheless, during his PhD research he read the work by Sophus Lie, and in particular encountered contact transformations. This led him also to the work with Victor Guillemin on the link between spectra of elliptic operators and periodic bicharacteristics.

Duistermaat introduced the notion of monodromy in Hamiltonian systems as obstruction to the existence of global action-angle coordinates, later, together with Richard Cushman, he extended it to the quantum systems.

In symplectic geometry he is well known for his article with his PhD student  on the Duistermaat–Heckman formula, which will later be placed in the more general framework of equivariant cohomology, independently by Berline and Vergne and by Atiyah and Bott. Other contributions in this field include a generalisation of the Morse index theorem and a contribution to the problem of quantisation commutes with reduction.

In his book on Lie groups, together with his PhD student Johan Kolk, he provided an alternative proof of the third Lie theorem, which will turn out to be crucial for proving the analogous theorem for Lie groupoids and for its applications to Poisson geometry.

His work with Alberto Grünbaum on the bispectral problem was influential for integrable systems and noncommutative algebraic geometry. In the last stages of his life he became interested in algebraic geometry and wrote a book on QRT maps and elliptic surfaces.

Duistermaat contributed also to applied mathematics. He was a consultant to Royal Dutch Shell, which led to the thesis of Christiaan Stolk on the inversion of seismic data. He also worked on barrier functions in convex programming, collaborated with biomedical technologists on computer vision and with geophysicists on modeling the polarity reversals of the Earth's magnetic field.

He supervised 25 PhD students.

Selected works 

;

References

External links 
 

20th-century Dutch mathematicians
Members of the Royal Netherlands Academy of Arts and Sciences
Scientists from The Hague
Utrecht University alumni
Academic staff of Utrecht University
1942 births
2010 deaths
Academia Europaea